Maurice Peter Gibb (7 February 1914 – 6 August 2000) was an Australian rules footballer who played for Melbourne in the Victorian Football League (VFL) during the 1930s and early 1940s.

Gibb originally tried out for Carlton but after being rejected was picked up by Melbourne after winning the 1933 Gippsland Football League's best and fairest award, the Trood Medal.

He was a forward and had his most prolific season in 1935 when he topped Melbourne's goalkicking with 59 goals in a tally which included two bags of nine. In 1940 and 1941 Gibb played in back to back premiership teams.

Footnotes

References
Holmesby, Russell and Main, Jim (2007). The Encyclopedia of AFL Footballers. 7th ed. Melbourne: Bas Publishing.

External links

Demon Wiki profile

1914 births
Australian rules footballers from Melbourne
Melbourne Football Club players
2000 deaths
Melbourne Football Club Premiership players
Two-time VFL/AFL Premiership players
People from Carlton, Victoria